Kieboom is a Dutch surname and it means "rock tree". Notable persons with this name include:
Carter Kieboom (born 1997), American Major League Baseball player
Jeanette Kieboom (born 1959), Australian javelin thrower
Ricardo Kieboom (born 1991), Dutch footballer
Spencer Kieboom (born 1991), American Major League Baseball player